Digitivalva valeriella is a moth of the family Acrolepiidae. It is found in Sweden, Denmark, Germany, France, Austria, Hungary, Romania, Slovakia, Poland, Lithuania, Latvia and Russia.

The wingspan is 10–12 mm.

The larvae feed on Inula britannica. They mine the leaves of their host plant. The mine has the form of one or some rather broad corridors radiating from the leaf base or the midrib. Later, it becomes an elongated blotch. Pupation takes within the leaf, in a separate small blotch without frass. Larvae can be found from October to May and again from July to August.

References

Acrolepiidae
Moths described in 1878
Moths of Europe